Luis Eduardo Maldonado (born March 26, 1985 in Montevideo) is a Uruguayan footballer currently playing for Rampla Juniors.

References
 
 
 eluniverso.com

1985 births
Living people
Uruguayan footballers
Uruguayan expatriate footballers
C.A. Progreso players
Villa Española players
El Tanque Sisley players
Sportivo Luqueño players
Boston River players
Portuguesa F.C. players
Gimnasia y Esgrima de Jujuy footballers
Miramar Misiones players
C.D. Marathón players
S.D. Quito footballers
Chacarita Juniors footballers
The Strongest players
Peñarol players
Cobreloa footballers
Sport Huancayo footballers
Nueva Chicago footballers
Rampla Juniors players
Paraguayan Primera División players
Primera B de Chile players
Uruguayan Primera División players
Torneo Federal A players
Ecuadorian Serie A players
Bolivian Primera División players
Uruguayan Segunda División players
Peruvian Primera División players
Uruguayan expatriate sportspeople in Argentina
Uruguayan expatriate sportspeople in Bolivia
Uruguayan expatriate sportspeople in Chile
Uruguayan expatriate sportspeople in Ecuador
Uruguayan expatriate sportspeople in Honduras
Uruguayan expatriate sportspeople in Paraguay
Uruguayan expatriate sportspeople in Venezuela
Uruguayan expatriate sportspeople in Peru
Expatriate footballers in Argentina
Expatriate footballers in Bolivia
Expatriate footballers in Chile
Expatriate footballers in Ecuador
Expatriate footballers in Honduras
Expatriate footballers in Paraguay
Expatriate footballers in Venezuela
Expatriate footballers in Peru
Association football defenders